Konstantinos Vakirtzis (born 2 October 1971) is a retired Greek football defender.

References

1971 births
Living people
Greek footballers
Kavala F.C. players
Aris Thessaloniki F.C. players
Panegialios F.C. players
Association football defenders
Super League Greece players